Victor Garcia may refer to:

 Víctor Manuel García Valdés (1897–1969), Cuban painter
 Victor Garcia (director) (1934–1982), Argentine stage director
 Víctor García (born 1974), Spanish film director
 Victor G. Garcia III, Filipino ambassador
 Víctor García (Spanish singer) (born 1970), Australian-Spaniard rock singer
 Víctor García (Mexican singer) (born 1975), Mexican singer and actor
 Víctor Andrés García Belaúnde (born 1949), Peruvian politician and congressman
 Víctor García (racing driver) (born 1990), Spanish driver
 Víctor García (volleyball) (born 1950), Cuban former volleyball player
 Víctor Garcia (Spanish director) (born 1974), Spanish-born film director
 Víctor García (runner) (born 1985), Spanish athlete
 Víctor García (cyclist) (born 1981), Spanish cyclist
 Víctor García (footballer, born May 1994), Spanish footballer
 Víctor García (footballer, born June 1994), Venezuelan footballer
 Victor García (footballer, born 1995), Salvadoran footballer
 Víctor García (footballer, born 1997), Spanish footballer
 Víctor García (water polo) (born 1952), Mexican Olympic water polo player